Bathyxylophila iota is a species of sea snail, a marine gastropod mollusk in the family Larocheidae

Distribution
This species occurs in the bathyal zone off New Zealand.

References

External links
 To World Register of Marine Species
]http://seashellsofnsw.org.au/Skeneidae/Pages/Bathyxylophila_iota.htm Shells of new South Wales: Bathyxylophila iota]

Larocheidae
Gastropods described in 1988